Neocancilla hartorum is a species of sea snail, a marine gastropod mollusk in the family Mitridae.

Description
The length of the shell attains 35.7 mm.

Distribution
This marine species occurs off the Cook Islands

References

 Poppe G.T., Salisbury R. & Tagaro S.P. (2015). Two new Mitridae from the Central Pacific. Visaya. 4(4): 77-84 page(s): 77, pl. 1.

External links
 Fedosov A., Puillandre N., Herrmann M., Kantor Yu., Oliverio M., Dgebuadze P., Modica M.V. & Bouchet P. (2018). The collapse of Mitra: molecular systematics and morphology of the Mitridae (Gastropoda: Neogastropoda). Zoological Journal of the Linnean Society. 183(2): 253-337
 Worms Link

Mitridae